John Miller Strachan (1832–1906) was the second Bishop of Rangoon.

He was born in Barnsley and educated at King's College London. He was ordained in 1861 and was a SPG in India until his episcopal appointment. He was consecrated on 1 May 1882. and served until 1902 when he resigned his see. He became a Doctor of Divinity (DD).

References

Year of birth unknown
19th-century Anglican bishops in Asia
20th-century Anglican bishops in Asia
Anglican bishops of Rangoon
1832 births
1906 deaths
Alumni of King's College London
People from Barnsley